The Australian Handball Federation (AHF) is the governing body for the Olympic sport of handball (also known as European Handball or Olympic Handball) in Australia.

History
The body was founded in 1985. In 1988, the body became the 100th member of the International Handball Federation. There are currently 204 member nations of the IHF.

State members

 State Members makeup on AHF website

National teams

The national team coach for the men is Ante Belicic 

The Australian Men's Indoor team have qualified for seven IHF World Men's Handball Championships, have won five Oceania Handball Nations Cups and participated in the Handball at the 2000 Summer Olympics – Men's tournament, Sydney.

The Australian Women's Indoor team have qualified for seven IHF World Women's Handball Championships and won six Oceania Handball Nations Cups and participated in the Handball at the 2000 Summer Olympics – Women's tournament|Sydney.

Both the Men's and Women's National Beach Handball teams have participated at three Beach Handball World Championships and Beach Handball at the 2013 World Games.

At a Junior level Australia has qualified for the IHF Women's Junior World Championship, IHF Men's Youth World Championship and Handball at the Youth Olympic Games. In 2013, the Men & Women Under 21 were invited to the 2013 Continental Challenge Trophy in Mexico. Neither team won a game.

Main pages
 Australia Men's Handball team
 Australia Junior Men's Handball team
 Australia Youth Boy's Handball team
 Australia Women's Handball team
 Australia Junior Women's Handball team
 Australia Youth Girl's Handball team
 Australia Men's Beach Handball team
 Australia Women's Beach Handball team

National championships
The National championships involve all state and territory federations. Main article Australian National Handball Championship

Australia also has a national club championship. The winner of this goes to the Oceania Handball Champions Cup. Main article Australian Handball Club Championship

See also
 Oceania Handball Nations Cup – Seniors 
 Oceania Handball Challenge Trophy – Junior (Under 21s)
 Oceania Youth Handball Championship – Youth – (Under 19s)
 Oceania Beach Handball Championship - Seniors
 Oceania Junior Beach Handball Championship - Under 19's
 Oceania Youth Beach Handball Championship - Under 17's
 Handball League Australia
 Australian University Games

References

External links
 
 Handball on the Australian Olympic web page
 Australian Institute of Sport Handball page
 Australia on the International Handball Federation page
 Oceania Continent Handball Federation page
 Australian Handball on the London Olympics web page
 Article on ABC Local 12 June, 2012
 Australian news on Team Handball.Com web site
 Australia could be a world power in handball – just add money. Quest Newspapers. Westside News. 5 July, 2011

National members of the Oceania Continent Handball Federation
Handball in Australia
Sports governing bodies in Australia
1985 establishments in Australia
Sports organizations established in 1985